Jerome T. Schwartz (born October 5, 1951) was an American politician, a logger and businessman.

Born in Chicago, Illinois, Schwartz graduated from Goodman-Armstrong Creek High School in Goodman, Wisconsin. He is a logger and insurance consultant. Schwartz served as chairman of the Armstrong Creek Town Board. In 1991, Schwartz served in the Wisconsin State Assembly and was known as the "Lumberjack Legislator." Schwartz was a Democrat.

Notes

1951 births
Living people
Politicians from Chicago
People from Forest County, Wisconsin
Businesspeople from Chicago
Mayors of places in Wisconsin
Democratic Party members of the Wisconsin State Assembly